Henri Horace Meyer (17 May 1801 – 2 February 1870) was a 19th-century French dramatist and novelist.

Managing director of the Théâtre de la Gaîté from 1839 to 1847, his plays were presented on the most important Parisian stages of his time including the Théâtre du Gymnase-Dramatique, the Théâtre de l'Ambigu-Comique, and the  Théâtre de la Gaîté.

In 1839, he witnessed the attack on 12 and 13 May.

Œuvres 

1834: Le Doigt de Dieu, drama in 1 act
1836: Amazampo, ou la Découverte du quinquina, drama in 4 acts and 7 tableaux
1836: L'Empereur et le soldat, ou le 5 mai 1821, souvenirs contemporains
1837: La fille d'un militaire, comédie-vaudeville in 2 acts, with Laurencin
1837: Richard Moor, drama in 4 acts, preceded by Une heure trop tard, prologue in 1 act
1838: Samuel le marchand, drama in 5 acts, with Louis Gabriel Montigny
1838: Candinot, roi de Rouen, vaudeville in 2 acts, with Hugues Bouffé, Charles-Hippolyte Dubois-Davesnes and Eugène Moreau
1839: Le Sylphe d'or, pièce fantastique in 3 acts, preceded by a prologue, with Montigny
1840: La Famille Dulaure, drame-vaudeville in 1 act
1840: Un moment d'ambition, ou Plus de peur que de mal, comédie-vaudeville in 1 act
1844: Le Mannequin du prince, drame-vaudeville in 3 acts, with Benjamin Antier
1850: Le sac à malices, féerie in 3 acts and 25 tableaux
1854: Harry-le-Diable, historical drama in 3 acts, with Narcisse Fournier
1854: La Partie de piquet, comédie-vaudeville in 1 act, with Fournier
1855: Jocelin le garde-côte, drama in 5 acts, with Fournier
1855: Le Mal de la peur, comedy in 1 act
1855: Penicaut le somnambule, comédie-vaudeville in 1 act, with Fournier
1857: Le Beau-père, comedy in 1 act
1858: M. Candaule, ou le Roi des maris, comédie-vaudeville in 1 act, with Fournier
1860: Le Chef de la Bande Noire, novel
1860: Une voix du ciel, comedy in 1 act, with Fournier
1861: Les Traboucayres, ou les chauffeurs de la montagne, drama in 5 acts and 9 tableaux, with Fournier
1861: Chassé-croisé, comedy in 1 act, with Fournier
1861: La Fille de l'armurier ou les Pays-Bas en 1482, novel
1862: Le portefeuille rouge, drama in 5 acts with a prologue, with Fournier
1863: Le Père Lefeutre, comédie-vaudeville in 4 acts, with Fournier
1863: Les ruines du château noir, drama in 9 tableaux, including a prologue, with Fournier
1865: Le Supplice de Paniquet, comedy in 1 act, with Fournier and Gustave Bondon
1876: Les Dumacheff, ou le Cocher fidèle, parodie de la pièce de l'Odéon : Les Danicheff, in 1 act and 2 tableaux, with Émile Desbeaux, posth.

References 

19th-century French dramatists and playwrights
19th-century French novelists
French theatre managers and producers
1801 births
Writers from Brussels
1870 deaths